The 6th Trampoline World Championships were held in Bern, Switzerland on 19 June 1970.

Results

Men

Trampoline

Trampoline Synchro

Women

Trampoline

Trampoline Synchro

References
 Trampoline UK

Trampoline World Championships
Trampoline Gymnastics World Championships
Trampoline World Championships
Trampoline World Championships
Trampoline World Championships